Porters Falls (also Little Morgantown, Morgantown, or Porter's Falls) is an unincorporated community in Wetzel County, West Virginia, United States. It lies at an elevation of 682 feet (208 m).

The first settlement at Porters Falls was made in 1818.

References

Unincorporated communities in Wetzel County, West Virginia
Unincorporated communities in West Virginia